Christopher Charles Sherriff Harborne (born December 1962) is a British businessman and technology investor based in Thailand. A University of Cambridge and INSEAD graduate, his donations have enabled the founding of INSEAD San Francisco and the creation of a blockchain research fund. He has also donated to Britain's Conservative Party and more recently has been a major donor to Britain's Brexit Party, donating more than £6 million in 2019. He also holds Thai citizenship under the name Chakrit Sakunkrit.

Early life and education
Christopher Harborne was born in December 1962. He was educated at Westminster School and is a graduate of Downing College, University of Cambridge, from where he received the degrees of MA, MEng and MBA. He also received an MBA from the Institut européen d'administration des affaires (INSEAD) in 1988.

Career
Harborne worked for five years as a management consultant at McKinsey and Co., before running a research company in Asia. He describes himself as an "investor in new tech, including open software blockchain platforms". He is the CEO of Sherriff Global Group which trades in private planes, and the owner of AML Global, a firm that sells aviation fuel. He has made a donation to enable the founding of INSEAD San Francisco and to create a Blockchain Research Fund. He has set up a company, Singular AI Consulting Limited, with crypto-currency miner Marco Streng. As of December 2019, he is based in Thailand.

Political donations
Harborne donated more than £6m to the Brexit Party in 2019, £3 million in the summer and £3 million before the United Kingdom general election in 2019, making him the largest donor that year. His sister Katharine, a scientist and artist who was previously a councillor for the Conservative Party, has been a candidate for the Brexit Party. Before switching his donations to the Brexit Party, Harborne had donated smaller sums, averaging £15,000 per annum since 2001, to the Conservative Party. In November 2022, Harborne donated £1 million to The Office of Boris Johnson Ltd, one of the biggest donations ever made to an individual British politician.

References

External links 
Christopher Charles Sherriff Harborne, International Consortium of Investigative Journalists.

Living people
1962 births
INSEAD alumni
British investors
British emigrants to Thailand
Reform UK
Alumni of Downing College, Cambridge
Businesspeople in aviation
People educated at Westminster School, London